Al-Hamraa (also spelled al-Hamra) is a village in northwestern Syria, administratively part of the Hama Governorate, located northeast of Hama. Nearby localities include Jubb al-Othman to the northeast, Abu al-Thuhur to the north, Fan al-Shamali to the west, Maar Shahhur to the southwest, Salamiyah to the south and Sabburah to the southeast. According to the Syria Central Bureau of Statistics (CBS), al-Hamraa had a population of 1,783 in the 2004 census. It is the administrative centre and second-largest locality of the al-Hamraa nahiyah ("subdistrict"), which consisted of 44 localities with a collective population of 32,604 in 2004.

In 1838 al-Hamraa was classified as a khirba ("temporal village") in the District of Salamiyah. It is situated near the Qasr ibn Wardan palace.

References

Bibliography

 

Populated places in Hama District
Towns in Hama Governorate